An actor is a person who plays a role in theater, cinema or television.

Films and entertainment
Actor (album), a 2009 album by St. Vincent
Actor (1978 film), a 1978 TV movie by American director Norman Lloyd
Actor (1993 film), a 1993 film by Iranian director Mohsen Makhmalbaf
Actor (2016 film), an Indian Kannada psychological thriller
A Screen Actors Guild Award, also known as the Actor

Science and computing
Actants, also called "actors", in actor-network theory (a general theory of sociological behaviour), the one who performs the act
In Interactions of Actors Theory, excitations in any medium able to produce action, a theory of cybernetics
Actor (UML), in requirements analysis and UML
Actor model, in concurrency, refers to a model of concurrent computation
Actor (programming language), an early object-oriented programming integrated development environment (IDE) for the Windows operating system
Actor, one of the two semantic macroroles in Role and reference grammar

Other uses 
 12238 Actor, Jovian asteroid
 Actor, a person who performs an action in a 'real-world', non-theatrical situation
 Actor (law)
 Actor (mythology), in Greek mythology, refers to a number of characters, including the father of Menoetius and Astyoche
 Actor (policy debate), the entity that enacts a certain policy action
 ACTOR (A Commitment to Our Roots), former name of The Hero Initiative
 "Actor", a 2015 song by Joker Xue
 Backhoe, part of a digging machine, sometimes called "back actor"

See also
State actor
Non-state actor
The Actor (disambiguation)
Actress (disambiguation)
Dramatis personæ